Tina Mba  is a Nigerian actress who was nominated for Africa Movie Academy Award for Best Actress in a Supporting Role in the 7th Africa Movie Academy Awards.

Career 
In 2017, she starred in Isoken, Bariga Suger, Okafor's Law amongst other films, and was described as "actress of the year" by Pulse. At the 2017 Africa Magic Viewers Choice Awards, she was nominated for the best actress in a comedy category. In an interview with The Punch, she disclosed that the secret to her stellar interpretation of roles was from living the character and imagining herself in it. She also stated that she would have preferred theatre to feature films, if she was paid equally for both. In 2016, she acted in Ufuoma, a romantic drama, directed by Ikechukwu Onyeka. In October 2017, she starred in  Omoye, which is an advocacy film against sexual violence. In 2017, she acted in the romantic comedy, Isoken alongside, Funke Akindele and Dakore Akande. She plays a mother, putting pressure on her daughter to get married and not be solely focused on her career. In the same year, YNaija recounts her previous roles in Tango with Me, Okafor's Law, Isoken, etc. while stating that her stellar performances are often not appreciated enough in the industry. It opined that the "Naija" body language she brings to her character gives more realistic expression to her roles.

In 2011, she received a nomination for Best Actress in a Supporting Role at the 7th Africa Movies Academy Award. Also in 2017, she was nominated for Best Actress in A Comedy at the 5th Africa Magic Viewer’s Choice Award for her performance in Meet the In-Laws.

Selected filmography 
 Isoken
 Okafor's Law
 Make a Move
 Married but Living Single
 Heroes and Zeroes
 Tango with Me
 The Tenant
 Beneath Her Veil (2015)
 Three Wise Men (2016)
 My Name is Kadi (2016)
 Banana Island Ghost (2017)
 The Bridge
 Nigerian Prince (2018)
 The Set Up (2019)
 Two Weeks in Lagos (2019)
 For Maria Ebun Pataki (2020)
Rise of the Saints (2020)
Breaded Life (2021)
Unintentional (2021)
The Rise of Igbinogun 
Tainted Canvas

Awards and nominations

Personal life 
Tina Mba was born in Delta State, Nigeria. However, she is a native of Enugu State. She is the first of seven children of her parents. She is a single mother with two children namely Tania and Joseph.

References

External links 
 

21st-century Nigerian actresses
Living people
Actresses from Delta State
Actresses from Enugu State
Year of birth missing (living people)
Nigerian actresses
Igbo actresses